Louie Walter Jennings (January 12, 1904 – October 25, 1957) was an American football player.

Jennings was born and raised in Muskogee, Oklahoma. He was then recruited to play football for the Terrill School, a Dallas boarding high school that was the forerunner of St. Mark's School of Texas. He graduated from Terrill in 1923. He then attended Haskell Indian College (the forerunner to the Haskell Indian Nations University before transferring to Centenary College, where he played on the varsity football team for 4 years.

After college, Jennings was an offensive and defensive lineman in the National Football League for 2 years. He played for the Providence Steam Roller in 1929 and the Portsmouth Spartans in 1930. He appeared in 11 NFL games, starting all of them.

Using his Native American name, Blue Sun, Jennings competed as a professional wrestler between 1931 and 1939, participating in 571 bouts. He is credited with 159 wins and 315 losses.

References

1904 births
1957 deaths
Haskell Indian Nations Fighting Indians football players
Centenary Gentlemen football players
Providence Steam Roller players
Portsmouth Spartans players
Players of American football from Oklahoma